Pulstar may refer to: 
 Pulstar (video game), a 1995 horizontal-scrolling shooter arcade game 
 PULSTAR, a nuclear reactor at North Carolina State University
 "Pulstar", a song by Vangelis from the 1976 album Albedo 0.39

See also
 Pulsar (disambiguation)